Diane Botcher (born 2 June 1959) is a Welsh actress. She has starred in several British television sitcoms and dramas, including the Sky comedy drama Stella, BBC comedies Little Britain and Tittybangbang and the ITV period drama Downton Abbey. In 2018, she joined Casualty as Jan Jenning.

Early life 
Botcher was born on 2 June 1959 in Taibach, Port Talbot, Glamorgan, in Wales, one of the two children of parents Bernard and Glenys Botcher. She read English and drama at Warwick University, and after graduating, trained at the Webber Douglas Academy of Dramatic Art drama school in London, then obtained an Equity card in the 1980s.

Career 
Throughout her long career on stage and screen, Botcher has been receiving warm reviews. In a performance of the musical Blood Brothers with the Sherman Theatre Company in 1986, Botcher's performance as the "warm-hearted mum" was singled out by a reviewer as one of the good points in a production which needed "beefing up". Of Black Milk (2003), a reviewer wrote, "In a strong cast, Di Botcher is a beacon." Her performance in the 2017/18 revival of Follies was universally appreciated - “wonderful”, with a "stunner of a set piece";

In 2018, she began appearing in the BBC medical drama Casualty as Jan Jennings. Later that year, she also began portraying the role of Nana Margie in the BBC Three series In My Skin. 2022 BBC Radio 4 The Archers as Caitlin Thomas.

Filmography

Film

Television

Selected stage performances

References

External links

21st-century Welsh actresses
Living people
People from Port Talbot
Welsh television actresses
Welsh film actresses
1959 births